"Cop That Shit", also known in its censored form as "Cop That Disc", is the lead single taken from hip-hop duo Timbaland & Magoo's third studio album, Under Construction, Part II. The track features vocals from Missy Elliott. The single was released on September 29, 2003 in Europe, but was not released in the United Kingdom until March 8, 2004. The hip hop track itself refers to people downloading and burning music instead of buying it. All of the tracks' verses are resung verses from classic rap songs, however some of the lyrics are changed. Timbaland's verse is a rewrite of "I Know You Got Soul" by Eric B. & Rakim, Missy's verse is a rewrite of Paper Thin by MC Lyte, and Magoo's verse is a rewrite of "I Got It Made" by Special Ed.

Music video
The music video for the track shows Timbaland, Missy and Magoo in various city scenes: subway station, neighborhood basketball court, taxi cab and in front of a spraypainted image of themselves. MC Lyte, Rakim and Special Ed appear through the verses that were borrowed from them, also rapper Flavor Flav made a cameo appearance. The video also features a rap interlude by rapper Sebastian from the song "Do Your Thang", and a dance choreography from Mari Koda, who would later star in the dance movie Step Up 3D. Big painting of late singer Aaliyah depicted as an angel appears through the whole video.

Track listing
 UK CD1
 "Cop That Shit" (Clean Radio Edit)
 "Cop That Shit" (Mentor Remix featuring Juggy D. Dirty)
 "Drop" (featuring Fatman Scoop)

 UK CD2 - Limited Edition Remix EP
 "Cop That Shit" (Clean Radio Edit)
 "Cop That Shit" (Mentor Remix)  
 "Cop That Shit" (Motivo Hi-Lectro Remix)  
 "Cop That Shit" (Limrak Remix) 
 "Cop That Shit" (Finest Remix)

 German CD single
 "Cop That Shit" (Clean Radio Edit)
 "Cop That Shit" (Dirty Edit)
 "Cop That Shit" (Instrumental)  
 "Cop That Shit" (Acappella)  
 "Cop That Shit" (Callout Hook)
 "Cop That Shit" (Music Video)

Charts

References

2003 singles
Missy Elliott songs
Music videos directed by Director X
Song recordings produced by Timbaland
Timbaland songs
2003 songs
Songs written by Timbaland
Songs written by Melvin Barcliff
Songs written by Missy Elliott
Songs written by MC Lyte